Ekinciler is a village in the Mazıdağı District of Mardin Province in Turkey. The village is populated by Kurds of the Dimilî tribe and had a population of 449 in 2021.

References 

Villages in Mazıdağı District
Kurdish settlements in Mardin Province